Oreodera lezamai is a species of beetle in the family Cerambycidae. It was described by Hovore in 1989.

References

Oreodera
Beetles described in 1989